HD 179079 b is an extrasolar planet which orbits the G-type subgiant star HD 179079, located approximately 228 light years away in the constellation Aquila. This planet has mass only 1/12 that of Jupiter or 1.5 times Neptune. The planet orbits very close to the star, at a distance of 0.11 AU. This planet takes two weeks to revolve around the star. This planet was discovered using the Keck telescopes on August 12, 2009.

References

Exoplanets discovered in 2009
Giant planets
Aquila (constellation)
Exoplanets detected by radial velocity
Hot Neptunes